Connaught Place is a square (and adjacent roadway) near Jardine House in Central, Hong Kong. The General Post Office and Exchange Square have Connaught Place addresses.

Opened in December 1977, the square is home to a statue by Henry Moore entitled Double Oval. The square and the surrounding buildings are all built in a 20th-century modern architectural style.

History
In 1976, Hongkong Land, the developer of the adjacent Connaught Centre (now Jardine House), approached the Urban Council and offered to help fund construction of the square. The company procured a preliminary layout plan and selected the Henry Moore sculpture. On 17 September 1976, the council agreed to proceed with project on a joint venture basis with Hongkong Land. Hongkong Land funded about 25 per cent of the project and retained ownership of the sculpture, while the council covered the remaining cost and managed the space following completion.

The square was completed in December 1977. The square and the sculpture were both formally unveiled on 20 December 1977 by Urban Council chairman A. de O. Sales.

Features
The focal point of the square is a sculpture by English artist Henry Moore titled Double Oval, one of two casts from a 1966 mould. Upon its unveiling in December 1977, it was dedicated to Vernon Roberts, former director and general manager of the Hongkong Land company, who had died on 21 October of that year.

Other features include planted areas, seating, and two large pools with fountains.

See also
List of streets and roads in Hong Kong
List of urban public parks and gardens in Hong Kong

References

External links
Google Maps of Connaught Place

Central, Hong Kong
Squares in Hong Kong
Urban public parks and gardens in Hong Kong
1977 establishments in Hong Kong
Roads on Hong Kong Island